1919 Revolution can refer to:
 The Egyptian Revolution of 1919
 The German Revolution of 1918–1919 that began in November 1918
 The Bavarian Soviet Republic
 The Hungarian Soviet Republic
 The Greater Poland Uprising (1918–1919)
 The establishment of civilian government following the Finnish Civil War

See also 

 Revolutions of 1917–23
 Aftermath of World War I
 Occupation of İzmir
 List of sovereign states in 1919
 :Category:Early Soviet republics
 :Category:Conflicts in 1919